Yerukula is a Dravidian language mainly spoken by the Yerukala tribe. This language is also called Kurru basha or Kulavatha. Yerukala is linguistically close to South Dravidian languages such as Ravula and Irula. Lexical similarity among these languages ranges from 53% to 81%; in the case of Irula, it varies from 33% to 38%; in case of Ravula, it varies from 28% to 45%; in case of modern Tamil, it varies from 27% to 45%.

Sathupati Prasanna Sree has developed a unique script for use with the language.

Some of the language terms, mostly relations.

References

External links
Yerukalas Home Page
Yerukala script

Tamil languages